Mansa Solar Power Plant is a 31.5 MW solar photovoltaic power generating station at Mirpur Kalan village of Mansa district in Punjab state of India.

Built by Hindustan Power, it is the largest single location solar power plant in Punjab with a capacity of 31.5 MW. The plant is spread over 173 acres and project cost is over ₹ 200 crore.

The plant was inaugurated on 29 September 2016 by Sukhbir Singh Badal, Deputy Chief Minister of Punjab.

See also 

 Solar power in India
 Renewable energy in India

References

Photovoltaic power stations in India
Energy infrastructure completed in 2016
2016 establishments in Punjab, India